Diesel Loco Shed, Gooty is an engine shed located in Gooty, Andhra Pradesh in India.  It falls under the jurisdiction of Guntakal railway division of South Coast Railway zone.

History
It is one of the oldest loco sheds, started by the british as a B.G Steam Loco Shed, later converted to B.G Diesel Loco Shed in 1963.

Operations
It is one of the largest loco shed handling more than 200 locos. It  handles routine maintenance on WDG-4 locos.

Locomotives

References

External links

GOOTY
Rail transport in Andhra Pradesh
Secunderabad railway division
1963 establishments in Andhra Pradesh